The St Austell River (meaning the little white river) properly known as the River Vinnick, but historically called The White River, is a  long river located in south Cornwall, England, United Kingdom. . The river has also been known as the "red river" due to tin streaming and mining activity upstream.

The river drains the central southern section of the St Austell Moorland, the second largest granite mass in Cornwall, an upland formed in the Variscan orogeny, to the north of St Austell.

The name White River has been adopted locally because waste water from china clay quarrying and refining practices was emptied into the river giving it a white colour.

The local term White River has given its name to the St Austell Town Centre Redevelopment Scheme, which is now called White River Place.

The route

At Carthew, the river heads south and passes Ruddlemoor and Trethowel in the Trenance Valley, where several mills and blowing houses made use of the river. This is a steep sided ‘V’ shaped valley carved through granite. A number of very minor tributaries enter this section, including springs and adits/levels at Gunheath, Lansalson, and Bojea. At the end of the Trenance Valley the river passes under the Cornish Main Line railway and enters St Austell.

The second tributary begins within the massive Littlejohn's/Dorothy china clay pit in a region that was originally known as Longstone Moor, where previously it had been a long, shallow valley that had drained the surrounding high moorland area. It travels southwards beneath a massive waste tip, whence it issues from a culvert at the head of the Gover Valley and the base of the tip. From there, it winds roughly south until it too reaches another viaduct belonging to the Cornish Main Line railway, wherefrom it turns east southeast and follows this heading for approximately a kilometre into St Austell, where it joins the Trenance Valley river.

See also

Gover Stream

References

External links

St Austell Stream or White River; Cornwall Rivers Project

Rivers of Cornwall